Badminton at the 2010 South Asian Games was held in Wooden-Floor Gymnasium in Dhaka, Bangladesh between 30 January and 4 February 2010. The badminton programme in 2010 included men's and women's singles competitions; men's, women's and mixed doubles competitions alongside men's and women's team events.

Medal summary

Medal table

Medalists 
The following players who won medals at the Games.

Results

Men's singles

Women's singles

Men's doubles

Women's doubles

Mixed doubles

References

External links 
 Individual event at www.tournamentsoftware.com

2010 South Asian Games
2010
South Asian Games
Badminton tournaments in Bangladesh